Roesleria is a fungal genus in the family Roesleriaceae.  

The genus was circumscribed by Felix Karl Albert Ernst Joachim von Thümen-Gräfendorf and Giovanni Passerini in Oesterr. Bot. Z. vol.27 on page 270 in 1877.

The genus name of Roesleria is in honour of Leonard Roesler (1839–1910), who was a German-Austrian chemist and oenologist, he was Professor 
at the Technical University of Karlsruhe in 1867.

Species
As accepted by Species Fungorum;
 Roesleria brasiliana 
 Roesleria bubonis 
 Roesleria norrlinii 
 Roesleria subterranea 

Former species;
 R. coniophaea  = Sclerophora pallida Coniocybaceae
 R. hyalinella  = Sclerophora peronella
 R. hypogaea  = Roesleria subterranea
 R. pallida sensu auct. p.p., = Roesleria subterranea 
 R. pallida  = Sclerophora pallida
 R. pallida var. farinacea  = Sclerophora farinacea
 R. pilacriformis = Roesleria subterranea

See also
 List of Ascomycota genera incertae sedis

References

Ascomycota genera
Taxa described in 1877
Taxa named by Felix von Thümen